KAOB-LD, virtual channel 27 (UHF digital channel 32), is a low-powered Heartland-affiliated television station licensed to Beaumont, Texas, United States. The station is owned by Dowen Johnson through his Windsong Communications company. It was founded on channel 69, but moved to channel 27 in 2008 due to displacement by the Federal Communications Commission (FCC).

Digital channels
The station's digital signal is multiplexed:

References

External links

2007 establishments in Texas
Beaumont, Texas
Television channels and stations established in 2007
Television stations in Texas
Low-power television stations in the United States